"Astronomy" is a song by American rock band Blue Öyster Cult that has appeared on several of the band's albums. It was first released on their 1974 album Secret Treaties. Their second live album, Some Enchanted Evening, included a version with an extended guitar solo and a third version was included on the Imaginos album. It was also re-recorded for the band's Cult Classic collection in connection with the TV miniseries of Stephen King's The Stand. Most recently, the song was included on the A Long Day's Night album.

Lyrics 

The song's lyrics are selected verses from a poem by Sandy Pearlman, the band's producer and mastermind behind their image, called "The Soft Doctrines of Imaginos". In the poem, which was later partially released under the BÖC moniker in the album Imaginos, aliens known as Les Invisibles guide an altered human named Imaginos, also called Desdinova, through history, playing key roles that eventually lead to the outbreak of World War I.

In "Astronomy", the character of Imaginos comes to realize his heritage and his role as the altered human. He is raised from the dead and transforms into the female persona of Desdinova, who is also mentioned on the back cover of Secret Treaties and in the song "I Am the One You Warned Me Of" from the Imaginos album.  References are made to celestial objects throughout the song: "the light that never warms" being the moon, "the queenly flux" the constellation Cassiopeia, though both may also serve as epithets or descriptions of Desdinova.  "My dog, fixed and consequent" refers to Sirius, the dog star. The "Four Winds Bar" may be a reference to the Tropic of Cancer, compass rose, or an actual bar.

Music video 
A music video of the 1988 version was released by Sandy Pearlman in the United Kingdom. The video had no footage of the band playing, and instead focused on the story told by the song. Longtime BÖC fan and author Stephen King recorded a spoken narration for the video, which is as follows:

Covers 
Metallica did a cover of the song for their 1998 Garage Inc. album.
Arch Enemy used the chorus for their song "Pilgrim" from the Burning Bridges album.
Albert Bouchard's band the Brain Surgeons recorded the song for their 1997 album Malpractise with Deborah Frost on lead vocals. Albert's post-Brain Surgeons band Ünderbelly released a version of the song with original Soft White Underbelly singer Les Braunstein on lead vocals in 2011.

References

External links 
Official lyrics

1974 songs
1998 songs
Blue Öyster Cult songs
Song recordings produced by Sandy Pearlman
Metallica songs
LGBT-related songs